Shabab District is a district (bakhsh) in Chardavol County, Ilam Province, Iran. At the 2006 census, its population was 11,004, in 2,306 families.  The District has one city: Shabab.  The District has two rural districts (dehestan): Shabab Rural District and Zanjireh Rural District.

References 

Districts of Ilam Province
Chardavol County